James Clyman (February 1, 1792 – December 27, 1881), also known as Jim Clyman, was a mountain man and an explorer and guide in the American Far West.

Early life
James Clyman was born on a farm that belonged to George Washington in Fauquier County, Virginia, in 1792. Clyman's family started to migrate from place to place when Clyman was 15, moving from Virginia to Pennsylvania, and then to Ohio. In 1811, his family decided to settle in Stark County, Ohio. In 1812, Clyman became a ranger to fight the Shawnee Indians in the War of 1812. After the war, he took up farming in Indiana, where he also traded with local Indians. In 1821, he became a surveyor working near the Little Vermilion River in Illinois. He was hired by a son of Alexander Hamilton, who was running government surveys, to make surveys along the Sangamon River.

Mountain Man
While collecting his pay in St. Louis in 1823, Clyman met William H. Ashley, and joined his 1823 expedition. Clyman remained with them until 1827. He fought in the Arikara War in 1823. As a member of Ashley's expedition, Clyman wrote one of the two accounts detailing Hugh Glass's mauling by grizzly bear. Clyman also traveled with Jedediah Smith, whose scalp and ear he sewed back on following a savage grizzly bear mauling, and Thomas Fitzpatrick in the discovery of the South Pass. He also was a member of the party of four that paddled around the Great Salt Lake and put to rest the myth of the Buenaventura River.

After his explorations, he bought a farm, near Danville, Vermilion County, Illinois and set up a store there. When the Blackhawk War broke out in 1832, Clyman joined the fight. He left the army in early 1834 and returned to Illinois. Less than a year later, he returned to Wisconsin, arriving there in January 1835. He spent some time in Milwaukee County and made the decision to venture further north in the fall with his friend Ellsworth Burnett. They left on November 4, 1835 and on the second day out, they were attacked by two Native American men near present-day Theresa, Dodge County. Burnett was killed, while Clyman was wounded but managed to escape and hide in the woods. This story became well known in the region and when in the years afterwards immigrants started to settle Dodge County they named one of the towns "Clyman" to remember what once happened in the area.

In later years, he traveled back West, crossing the Great Salt Lake Desert and the Sierra Nevada. On his way back, he encountered the Donner-Reed Party and accompanying parties. He advised them to avoid taking a shortcut and remain on the regular route. They did not heed his warning and ended up resorting to cannibalism after becoming stranded and trapped by an early blizzard in the Sierra Nevada.

In 1848, Clyman settled in the Napa County, California where he built a home on Redwood Road.  He died there in 1881 and was buried in the Tulocay Cemetery in Napa, California. The Clyman home went on the market in early 2022 following a major restoration.   The home sold in March of 2022 for the $1.85 Million asking price.

References

Sources
DeVoto, Bernard The Year of Decision: 1846 Boston: Little, Brown, 1943.
Morgan, Dale L. Jedediah Smith and the Opening of the American West. University of Nebraska Press, 1964.
Stone, Irving. Men to Match my Mountains. New York, 1956.

1792 births
Mountain men
History of the American West
1881 deaths
People from Fauquier County, Virginia
United States Army Rangers
American people of the Black Hawk War
United States Army personnel of the War of 1812